Valentin Chistyakov (born 1 November 1939) is a Russian former hurdler who competed in the 1960 Summer Olympics and in the 1964 Summer Olympics.

References

External links
 

1939 births
Living people
Russian male hurdlers
Soviet male hurdlers
Russian male sprinters
Soviet male sprinters
Olympic athletes of the Soviet Union
Athletes (track and field) at the 1960 Summer Olympics
Athletes (track and field) at the 1964 Summer Olympics
Universiade medalists in athletics (track and field)
Universiade gold medalists for the Soviet Union
Medalists at the 1961 Summer Universiade